James Tracy is a former Irish rugby union player for Leinster Rugby. His preferred position was hooker. He made his senior debut in November 2012 against the Ospreys. In May 2014 he was promoted to the Leinster senior squad for the 2014–15 season following completion of the academy. Tracy made his debut for Ireland against Canada on 12 November 2016, scoring a try after coming on as replacement in second half.  He went on to win 5 more caps with Ireland, with a start against Japan in 2017.

On 22 December 2022, he announced his retirement from rugby, due to an ongoing neck injury.

References

External links
Ireland Profile
Leinster Profile
Pro14 Profile

1991 births
Living people
Rugby union hookers
Leinster Rugby players
Irish rugby union players
People educated at Newbridge College
Rugby union players from County Kildare
Ireland international rugby union players